Athous latior is a species of click beetle of the family  Elateridae found in the Western Caucasus, on Laba River in Krasnodar, and Karachay-Cherkessia.

References 

Beetles described in 1994
Beetles of Asia